Love to Love is a Philippine television drama romance anthology broadcast by GMA Network. It premiered on July 13, 2003 replacing Kahit Kailan. The show concluded on October 22, 2006 with a total of 171 episodes.

Instalments

Season 1

Rich in Love
Friends and partners in crime, Richmond (Oyo Boy Sotto) and Robbie (Bryan Revilla) learn that switching roles has its ups and downs. Richmond gets even closer to Trina (Maxene Magalona) and Robbie makes progress with Annaliza (Valerie Concepcion). But as to how long they can keep up their charade is up to their wits and luck?

Maid for Each Other
A modern-day version of Snow White, this episode revolves on the adventures and misadventures of Jen (Chynna Ortaleza), a rich girl from Cebu who tries to escape from here evil stepmother and finally reached Manila. In here, she met Dodong (Cogie Domingo) a family driver who helped her apply for work in a rich family. In the mansion, she came to know the spoiled balikbayan, Ralph (Richard Gutierrez) as well as Emilie (Nancy Castiglione), Ralph's kind sister. Who are made for each other?

Season 2

My 1, 2 Love
Richard Gutierrez plays a dual role — as hot teen star JM Rodriguez and farm boy Tomas. JM and Casey de Leon (Anne Curtis) are the hottest love team in the country. Nikki (Chynna Ortaleza), on the other hand, is Casey's cousin, all-around assistant and best friend. Nikki is secretly in love with JM, but knows she has no chance to steal him from her cousin.

Fans of JM and Casey are awaiting the premiere of an upcoming movie, “My One, True Love.” Some twist of fate, though, will change the lives of everyone. JM meets an accident and goes into a coma. Nikki is desperate. She has to find a way to keep the fans’ love for the love team burning. Like a miracle, she meets Tomas, a young man working in a rice farm. He looks exactly like JM. Now, you have a hint of what this teeny-bop love story is all about.

Yaya Lovely
Sunshine Dizon plays a nanny in household in one of the units in a condominium. She is Lovely Santos who is being pursued by a postman, Nonoy (Geoff Eigenmann).

When she starts getting invitations to parties, Lovely becomes curious. She gets the surprise of her life when she meets a namesake, a magazine writer who lives in one of the units in the same condominium building.

The other Lovely Santos is played by Tin Arnaldo. Frank Garcia plays a guy who become smitten with Lovely, the maid, whom he mistakes for Lovely, the writer.

Season 3

Kissing Beauty
Chara (Angel Locsin) works as a mascot in an amusement park. She feels lucky that her job lets her wear a mask because she knows she is not pretty. But even if her face is not beautiful, she has a kind heart and great personality. This is why her friend Joseph (Cogie Domingo), a rides operator, is always by her side. Chara does not have any illusions that Joseph or any other guy could fall for her... she thinks she's just too ugly. So all she does is fantasize. And the object of her fantasies is none other than Alfred (Dennis Trillo), the son of the coffee shop owner near the amusement park.

Then one day, she receives a “magic lipstick” and she magically transforms into a beautiful girl! Nobody recognizes her & she introduces herself as Charina.

Alfred meets Charina & will fall in love with her. Chara's dreams are coming true! But she can’t kiss him because when the lipstick wears off, so will her beauty! And so by day, the ugly Chara is with Joseph. By night, the pretty Charina is with Alfred.
But love has never quite this simple... how long can Chara keep pretending?

Duet for Love
Tammy (Toni Gonzaga) is vacationing at a beach resort when she meets Marvin (Jay-R), a cute Amboy. It is love at first sight. They hit it off when they discover that they have so many things in common, especially their love for singing.

Tammy is a videoke queen, while Marvin has been asked by his mom to come back home and try showbiz here in the Philippines. In the few days together at the resort, a summer love is formed and when it's time to say goodbye, they promise to keep in touch.

All is well until they discover that their parents are embroiled in a bitter feud. Marvin's mom, Aling Diana (Pinky Marquez) owns Diana's Carinderia and Sing-along which. Right across Barry's Turo-Turo and Videoke, owned by Mang Barry (Hajji Alejandro), Tammy's father. Aside from being fierce business competitors, Diana & Barry share a past which went from sweet to sour. Now they are bitter & hostile towards each other, and that's the way they want their kids to be too.

Marvin & Tammy are caught in the crossfire. Can their summer love withstand all the pressure? Will love win after all?

Season 4

Pretty Boy
The story is about a campus basketball heartthrob named Ian, (Paolo Contis), who loses his athletic scholarship because of his poor performance in school.

Determined to get back on the court, the basketball heartthrob tries out in the varsity teams of different schools. Since the basketball season has already started, no team was willing to take him in. Just as he was about to lose hope, Ian stumbles on a chance to regain his scholarship by joining an all-female basketball team. This is really an improbable plot line, but it normally works well with the young and naive audience.
With the right wig, fake boobs, and a total makeover, Ian becomes Ianne, who convincingly blends in with the girls. In time she becomes the newest bombshell in campus. Everything runs smoothly until Ianne discovers that he is in love with his teammate Jamie (Nancy Castiglione). Will Ianne remove his disguise and risk education for love?

Sweet Exchange
Cathy (Karylle) is an orphan from Bantayan Island, Cebu. She is looking for a job so she can pay off her family's debt.

At the pier while waiting to board the ferry that would take her to Cebu City, Cathy suddenly finds herself amidst stranded passengers. She meets resort owner Derek (Edward Mendez), who was on his way to Cebu City to fetch his fiancé, Trisha (Iza Calzado). The couple is scheduled to go to Manila to announce their engagement to their families.

Thrilled and excited Derek shows Cathy the engagement ring, an heirloom from his mother. Cathy admires the ring and happily tries it on. After a few minutes Cathy removes the ring so she can give it back to Derek for sake keeping, however, for some strange reason the ring wouldn’t come off. Derek, seeing Cathy having difficulty in removing the ring from her finger let her wear it for a while.

Eager to see his fiancée, Derek hires a small canoe to take him and Cathy to the city. The boat capsizes. Derek gets lost in the vastness of the sea and only Cathy was rescued and taken safely to the city by the fishermen.

With the ring on her finger, David (Dingdong Dantes), Derek's brother, mistakes Cathy for his missing brother's fiancée. And before she could set things straight, Cathy finds herself thrust into the whirl of life of Derek's family.

Cathy tries very hard to pretend that she knew Derek very well and even makes up tall stories about their life together. As days pass, she begins to realize that her heart is beating for David.

Season 5

True Romance
The story is about Lora (Sunshine Dizon) a bestselling romance pocketbook novelist who has yet to find out if the happy-ending manuscripts she writes can happen for real, and a successful construction magnate named Paco (Antonio Aquitania) whose goal is to find the girl he will marry before the year ends.

The loves and lives of Lora and Paco become intertwined when the novelist fails to pay her rent after most of her recent works gets rejected by her editor Joaquin (Brad Turvey), whom she secretly admires. Thus, checks have been coming in slow and bills are piling up.

The two meet when Paco, the rich, brusque, well-organized, domineering businessman, is about to throw Lora out of the apartment. But when he realizes she might be of help in accomplishing the only thing that his mother asks him to do - that is to find the woman he will marry - Paco then offers the writer to stay in the apartment provided that Lora will help him snag a bride, to which Lora reluctantly agrees.

The personality enhancement session is starting to have positive results because in no time Maricel (Jacque Estevez), a pretty Cebuana, is easily charmed by Paco. But Paco doesn't know that Lora is already falling for him! The situation becomes knottier for Lora when her handsome editor starts to pay her special attention. With such complicated situations, will Lora be able to write the happy-ending of her very own romance?

Love Blossoms
Love Blossoms highlights the love story of Jasmine (Jolina Magdangal), a florist and a true-blue romantic who has been dreaming to have a perfect wedding with a perfect partner handsome, smart, thriving in his profession and very much in love with her.

Jasmine's love life will start to become colorful when she meets her childhood sweetheart Martin (Alfred Vargas), a rebellious but passionate guy who refuses to be bound by his parents' decisions.

The two accidentally arrive as guests in a wedding and are walking down the aisle when Jasmine trips and Martin catches her. Instantly, the two remember each other and rekindle their old flame.

The colorful days of Jasmine get complicated when she meets Edward (Biboy Ramirez), a reliable, predictable and handsome hotel manager who becomes her persistent suitor.

The florist finds that fate keeps throwing her towards Martin, but she also thinks that she has something special with Edward. And since Jasmine likes her fortune being told, she gets her predictions mixed up! Could Edward be the one for her? But what if Martin is the one? How will she find her way back into his arms?

Season 6

Wish Upon a Jar
Wish Upon a Jar tells the story of Neneng (Yasmien Kurdi), a street food vendor, and her new found treasure Obet, the Genie (Rainier Castillo). Pretty, simple and ambitious, Neneng dreams of becoming rich someday and this will be realized soon as she stumbles upon a unique jar that contains Obet, the Genie. Having been trapped in the jar for decades, Obet thinks he is still in the 1970s when he first comes out of it.
As a rule, Obet must grant Neneng's three wishes, and their heartwarming, romantic story begins as Obets falls in love with Neneng. Will Obet find a way to keep himself out of the jar and closer to Neneng? Will Neneng also fall in love with the charming genie and use her last wish to set him free?

Love for Rent
Francine Prieto plays Amy, a tour guide, and Keempee de Leon is Jason Patrick who has just been deported to the Philippines after staying for seven years in the US. He realizes that the right time has come for him to be a father to his daughter Marcia (Sandy Talag), his lovechild with his ex-girlfriend Lucy (Karla Estrada). But Lucy, who has just married a man who can fulfill her dreams of living in the States, refuses to give in to Jason's plea, leading him to think of ways to get close to his daughter.

Amy has been a second mother to Marcia and even treats the child as her own every time Lucy is away. Lucy dreams of going abroad to work there. Meanwhile, she is not earning enough from her work as a tour guide because having Marcia with her entails additional expenses. Lucy has left for the US, but she'll be back in a few months.

Amy shares the rent of the apartment with Honeylet (Nancy Castiglione), who plays a physical therapist. Because she needs extra money, Amy accepts Jason Patrick (who poses as the gay Patricia) as a boarder.

Season 7

Love Ko Urok
Mark Herras plays the role of Urok, who comes from the Malagumba Tribe from the Umbubalu-ubu mountains who is caught by the soldiers to be used in research. Urok is able to escape but because he doesn't know the way home, he got lost in the city where he crosses path with Nina, a city girl, played by Jennylyn Mercado.

When transformed through a make-over, Urok becomes Rock. Will Nina fall for him when his looks are changed to that of a city boy?

Haunted Lovehouse
Nadia (Chynna Ortaleza), who works as call center agent, is the girlfriend of Nico (Paolo Contis) who lives alone in the house of her grandmother. Nadia feels her world collapsing when she learns of his boyfriend's death in an accident. Her problem is compounded with the appearance of Bogart (Jay-R), the boyfriend of Jessica (Cindy Kurleto) who was also a ghost. Bogart insists that the land on which Nadia's house was built is his grandfather's and it's his inheritance. So, Nadia is forced to share the house with Bogart.

Season 8

Stuck in Love
Stuck in Love is about Siamese twins who have always dreamed of living separately. Though stuck together since birth, their personalities are totally different from each other because Barbie (Ryza Cenon), a.k.a. B1, is a totally boy-crazy girl while Berna (LJ Reyes), a.k.a. B2, is a conservative young lady.

Barbie and Berna's lifelong dream of living separately is granted when Fairy Godmother (Ruby Rodriguez) gives them a magical necklace that can be worn only for eight hours. As the twins get a chance to live a normal life, Kiko (CJ Muere), son of the twins’ nanny, will try to get closer and reveal his true feelings for Barbie. Meanwhile, JD (Mike Tan), the campus heartthrob, finds his way to soften the heart of the snobbish Berna.

Conflicts arise when Barbie and Berna find out that their freedom comes with a price—the one wearing the necklace transforms to a pretty lass while the other becomes ugly. This will lead to a fight between the sisters over the magical necklace. Will sisters Barbie and Berna give up each other for love?

Love-an o Bawi
The second story is about Princess (Ciara Sotto), a promdi girl who dreams of becoming a famous pop diva in Manila. This college undergraduate will do anything to fulfill her dreams, so she agrees to be a helper in the house of Troy (Ian Veneracion), a powerful executive of a recording company.

But Troy fires Princess when he learns the pop star-wannabe is not the nanny sent by the agency. And since Gemma (Jopay Paguia), Princess’ cousin, can’t pay Troy for the items she destroyed in the recording executive's office, Gemma is forced to take on the job. Gemma falls in love with Troy and strives to be the type of woman the recording executive likes but just appears trying hard in the process.

Meanwhile, Princess meets dancing policeman Eric (Paolo Ballesteros) who has been assigned to keep watch on Troy, who is suspected of being involved in piracy. Initially, Eric wants to use Princess to get close to Troy, but fate seems to keep the paths of these two young souls to cross over again.

Season 9: Get Lucky in Love

Miss Match
Miss Match revolves around Joey (Jennylyn Mercado), a young small gym owner who is also a clumsy clairvoyant. But Joey is not an "I–see–dead-–people" clairvoyant, she only sees a cute, chubby Cupid, the universal matchmaker who has the power to make people fall in love with his magic crossbow.

Joey, who teaches students not to depend on men, befriends Cupid but her clumsiness causes her to break his crossbow, leaving the chubby matchmaker useless. As punishment, Cupid orders Joey to do his duties — that is to make people fall in love but this time without the use of the magic crossbow.

Trouble begins when Cupid orders Joey to do two assignments: First matchmake Migs (Jake Cuenca), a charming, rich entrepreneur who puts up a bigger gym near Joey's fitness center; and second, bring her cousin Jonard (Dion Ignacio) and her best friend Portia (Katrina Halili) back into each other's arms after their bad break-up several years ago.

Will Joey leave her own fitness center and enroll in Migs' gym to easily match him with someone? But what if she finds herself falling in love with Migs? How can she fulfill her assignment as a matchmaker? And can she bring Portia and Jonard back in each other's arms even when they have sworn off each other as enemies?

Like Mother, Like Daughters
Like Mother, Like Daughters begins when Susan (Gloria Diaz), a mother neck-deep in debt, becomes desperate in looking for rich husbands for her daughters Arlene (Isabel Oli) and Cherry Pie (Julia Clarete). The only thing they have is a mansion left to them by Susan's deceased husband. Problems arise when Susan's stepsons Ivan (Paolo Contis) and Mike (Alfred Vargas) who both live in America, want the mansion back to them. Susan wants one of her daughters to charm Ivan, who is the first to arrive from the States, but Arlene turns unwilling while Cherry Pie easily agrees.

Cherry Pie then tries to attract Ivan but to no avail. What Susan doesn't know is that Arlene has already charmed Ivan when they meet at the coffee shop where Arlene works. However, both do not know each other's identity. Desperate in also keeping the mansion, the meddling mom makes Ivan a love potion to get him interested in Cherry Pie. Will Susan's plan be successful?

Mike, meanwhile, is a no-nonsense businessman who flies back home and forces Susan and her daughters to leave the mansion, but Susan begs him to let the ladies stay in the mansion even if they will work as house helps. When Mike comes across Arlene, he dislikes her right away.

Now that Mike and Arlene get to spend more time together in the house, will he admit to himself that he is falling for her? But Arlene has already set her eyes on Ivan and Ivan's love is her not Cherry Pie. Will the love potion keep them from being with their true love?

Season 10: A Toast to Love

My Darling Mermaid
When Ariel (Mark Herras) was a little boy, he met someone that most people never get to meet—a mermaid, the same age as he. He only sees her one time and never again.

Years later, Ariel goes to the beach to find inspiration as a painter.

While out snorkeling, he nearly drowns, and he is rescued by a beautiful girl. He wakes up groggily to find out that the girl is a mermaid. She quickly jumps back into the sea, disappearing instantly. He tells his friends about this experience, but no one believes him except for Patty (Bianca King), his fiancée.

What Ariel doesn't know is that Patty was also a mermaid. She was banished from sea because of something she had done. And this is why she believes his story.

Under the sea, we meet Maya (Pauleen Luna) a mermaid with a mission. She has to find the Green Pearl, stolen by the evil mermaid, Ara. Ara left the sea and went into hiding on land. It is up to Maya to recover the Green Pearl from Ara. Thalia, queen of the merfolk, gives Maya a magic oil which turns her mermaid tail into legs.

Maya finds herself drawn to Ariel's beach house. She watches Ariel from afar and falls in love with him. She even saves him from drowning one time. Yes, Maya is the same little mermaid he met as a child! Is this coincidence or destiny?

How can Maya convince Ariel that she is `Ms. Right’? And should Ariel fall for her, there is one more problem. Does he stay on land and bid goodbye to Maya, or does he go with her and bid goodbye to humanity? And, to complicate matters, could Ara and Patty be one and the same person, er, mermaid?

Young at Heart
The story begins with Lolo Jose (Leo Martinez), a widower, and Lola Clara (Luz Valdez), an old maid. They are sworn enemies & neighbors who have grown old together in a small sleepy provincial town.

Life suddenly changes when each one finds a magic vinyl record. When the record plays, they suddenly find themselves young again! Excited to have their youth back, Joey (Marky Cielo) and Claire (Jackie Rice) rediscover the joys of being young and carefree.

Unknown to Clara and Jose, their parents had arranged to marry them off to each other when they were younger. Things didn't work out. Clara never married and Jose's wife died young. Will this be their second shot at love?

Meanwhile, Denise (Iwa Moto), Lola Clara's grandniece, has just arrived from the city. She's been sent to her Lola as punishment for being a naughty brat. While there, she meets Tonying (Gian Carlos), Lolo Jose's grandson, a shy provincial boy raised by Jose since he was a kid.

Tonying and Denise are total opposites and because of this, they don’t click right away. Then Denise meets Joey, the young Lolo Jose, and she is attracted with his debonair, old world charms. This dismays Lola Clara (aka Claire) who finds herself being pursued by Ton! Old-fashioned Clara is scandalized by Tonying's modern ways of courtship.

In this cotillion of lovers both young and young-at-heart will the right partners end up together?

Season 11: True Colors... True Love

Best Friends
Best Friends revolves around the unusual relationship of gay Mandy (Paolo Ballesteros) and tomboy Sam (Ciara Sotto). The lives and loves of Sam and Mandy begin to get tangled when Sam's crush, Kaye (Valerie Concepcion), falls in love with her bubbly best friend Mandy!

Things get more complicated when Mandy becomes head over heels in love with his crush, Gio (Marco Alcaraz). But this chick boy finds it challenging to woo a hard-to-get woman like Sam than any other girls around.

How will Mandy and Sam free themselves from this knotted situation? Will they find the affection they need in the arms of their crushes, or will they find true love in each other? Do best friends really make the best of lovers?

Fat is Fabulous
Fat is Fabulous is a magical tale of an obese student named Cristy (Isabel Oli), who have always dreamed of becoming thin. Her wish has been granted when a weird scientist plays fairy godfather to her and gives her some magic diet pills— instantly changing her figure from blubber to a slim and sexy young lady!

With her new fabulous form and beauty, Cristy becomes an instant celebrity in school. She will have a cool and popular group of friends and, most of all, she will have a budding romance with her long-time crush, substitute instructor Bruce (Justin Cuyugan).

As Cristy's newfound life overwhelms her, she forgets her old-time friend and nerdy buddy Boyong (Paolo Contis). But what if Cristy's magic diet pills begin to conk out? Will Bruce continue to love big fat Cristy? And once Cristy and Boyong learn to be proud of who they are, will they realize that their true colors match?

Season 12: The Musical Finalé

Jass Got Lucky
Jass Got Lucky revolves around Jass (Lovi Poe), a cripple and a poor orphan who works in the school canteen. Gifted with a beautiful voice, Jass dreams of being the lead star in a school play and becoming famous someday. But insecurities about her handicap prevent her from pursuing her dream. Her fate changes when she founds a pair of magical high-heeled shoes that transforms her into the person she has always dreamed of. 

When Jass wears the magical high-heeled shoes, she becomes Angel, the cool, confident diva and the newest “crush ng bayan.” Angel has all the confidence and personality that Jass never had in her life. She then joins the talent show and meets the campus bad boy, Rico (Cogie Domingo), who rebels from his dad who's forcing him to play basketball when he wants to be a rocker.

Also stars Bianca King as Paris, the school's Ms. Popularity; Ryza Cenon, Iwa Moto, and Gian Carlos together with Chuck Allie, Vaness del Moral, Arci Muñoz, Nikki Bacolod, Alyssa Alano and Joey Marquez.

Cast
Season 1 (Rich in Love / Maid For Each Other): (Rich in Love): Oyo Boy Sotto, Maxene Magalona, Bryan Revilla, Valerie Concepcion// (Maid For Each Other) Richard Gutierrez, Chynna Ortaleza, Nancy Castiglione, Cogie Domingo,
Season 2 (Yaya Lovely / My 1, 2, Love): (Yaya Lovely): Tin Arnaldo, Frank Garcia, Sunshine Dizon, Geoff Eigenmann// (My 1, 2, Love) Richard Gutierrez, Chynna Ortaleza, Anne Curtis, Kiel Rodriguez.
Season 3 (Kissing Beauty / Duet For Love): (Kissing Beauty): Dennis Trillo, Angel Locsin, Cogie Domingo, Dion Ignacio, Nadine Samonte// (Duet For Love) Jay-R, Toni Gonzaga, Mark Herras, Jennylyn Mercado.
Season 4 (Pretty Boy / Sweet Exchange): (Pretty Boy): Paolo Contis, Nancy Castiglione, JC De Vera, Cristine Reyes, Gabby Eigenmann,  Julianne Lee, Cindy Kurleto,// (Sweet Exchange) Dingdong Dantes, Karylle, Bettina Rodriguez, Railey Valeroso, Iza Calzado, Andrew Paredes.
Season 5 (True Romance / Love Blossoms): (True Romance): Antonio Aquitania, Sunshine Dizon, Brad Turvey, Aifha Medina// (Love Blossoms):Jake Cuenca, Sheena Halili, Alfred Vargas, Jolina Magdangal, Biboy Ramirez.
Season 6 (Wish Upon a Jar / Love for Rent): (Wish Upon a Jar): Yasmien Kurdi, Rainier Castillo, Jay Aquitania, Bianca King, Katrina Halili // (Love for Rent): Keempee de Leon, Francine Prieto, Nancy Castiglione, Jeremy Marquez, Kimberly Loveless.
Season 7 (Love Ko Urok / Haunted Lovehouse) // (Love Ko Urok): Mark Herras, Jennylyn Mercado, Mike Tan, LJ Reyes, Megan Young, Chris Martin // (Haunted Lovehouse): Jay-R, Chynna Ortaleza, Paolo Contis, Cindy Kurleto
Season 8 (Stuck in Love / Love-ban o Bawi): (Stuck in Love): Ryza Cenon, LJ Reyes, Mike Tan, CJ Muere //(Love-ban o Bawi):  Ian Veneracion, Jopay Paguia, Ciara Sotto, Paolo Ballesteros
Season 9 (Miss Match / Like Mother, Like Daughters): (Miss Match): Jennylyn Mercado, Jake Cuenca, Katrina Halili, Dion Ignacio // (Like Mother, Like Daughters): Isabel Oli, Julia Clarete, Paolo Contis, Alfred Vargas
Season 10 (My Darling Mermaid / Young at Heart): (My Darling Mermaid): Pauleen Luna, Mark Herras, Bianca King // (Young at Heart): Jackie Rice, Iwa Moto, Marky Cielo, Gian Carlos
Season 11 (Fat is Fabulous / Bestfriends): (Fat is Fabulous): Isabel Oli, Paolo Contis, Marco Alcaraz // (Bestfriends): Ciara Sotto, Paolo Ballesteros
Season 12 (Jass Got Lucky) Lovi Poe, Iwa Moto, Bianca King, Cogie Domingo, Marky Cielo, Ryza Cenon, Nikki Bacolod

Accolades

References

External links
 

2003 Philippine television series debuts
2006 Philippine television series endings
GMA Network original programming
Philippine anthology television series